is a Japanese voice actor from Kanagawa Prefecture, Japan.

Voice roles

Anime television series
Amaenaideyo (Yume Karyuudo)
Boruto: Naruto Next Generations (Rock Lee)
Desert Punk (Tamehiko Kawano)
Gokusen (Haruhiko Uchiyama)
Kekkaishi (Shu Akitsu)
Naruto (Rock Lee)
Naruto: Shippuden (Rock Lee)
Rock Lee & His Ninja Pals (Rock Lee)
Soul Hunter (Sibuxiang)
The Galaxy Railways (Franz)
Zentrix (Mango)

Video games
Naruto series (Rock Lee)
Bleach the King of Fighters series (2007-onwards) (Rock Howard)

Dubbing

Film
American Pie Presents: Beta House - Dexter (JP Dub)
Going to the Mat - Vincent "Fly" Shu (JP Dub)
Just My Luck - Additional Voices (JP Dub)
Prom Night - Ronnie Heflin (JP Dub)
Roll Bounce - Mixed Mike (JP Dub)
See No Evil - Additional Voices (JP Dub)
Simon Says - Young Stanley (JP Dub)
You Got Served - Marty (JP Dub)

TV series
24 - Josh (JP Dub)
The 4400 - Additional Voices (JP Dub)
Body of Proof - Additional Voices (JP Dub)
Brothers & Sisters - Additional Voices (JP Dub)
Criminal Minds - James (JP Dub)
Disney Channel Games - Additional Voices (JP Dub)
Hannah Montana - Additional Voices (JP Dub)
The O.C. - Additional Voices (JP Dub)

Animation
Deep - Evo
The House of Magic - Daniel

References

External links

Yōichi Masukawa at Ryu's Seiyuu Infos

1978 births
Living people
Japanese male video game actors
Japanese male voice actors
Ken Production voice actors
Male voice actors from Kanagawa Prefecture